Kitty Kane may refer to:

 Kitty Kane, a character played by Sheree North in the 1956 film The Best Things in Life Are Free
 Kitty Kane Murder, a character played by Susan Sarandon in the 2005 film Romance & Cigarettes